The Legislative Assembly of Prince Edward Island is the sole chamber of the General Assembly of Prince Edward Island. The Legislative Assembly meets at Province House, which is located at the intersection of Richmond and Great George Streets in Charlottetown. Bills passed by the Assembly are given royal assent by the King of Canada in Right of Prince Edward Island, represented by the lieutenant governor of Prince Edward Island.

History
As a colony, Prince Edward Island originally had a bicameral legislature founded in 1773 with the Legislative Council of Prince Edward Island serving as the upper house and the House of Assembly as the lower house. Together they composed the 1st General Assembly of the Island of Saint John. After the name of the colony changed in 1798, the body became known as the General Assembly of Prince Edward Island.

In 1769, a British Order in Council established a new government on the British colony of St. John's Island (present day P.E.I.). In 1770, Lieutenant Governor Walter Patterson (the island's first Governor) arrived and appointed a Council to assist him in the administration of the island. By 1773, at the insistence of the British government, Governor Patterson summoned the island's first assembly.

Elections for the island's first House of Assembly were held on July 4, 1773, with 18 members being elected. Tradition has it that the first session of the island's new assembly was held in the Crossed Keys Tavern on the corner of Queen and Dorchester Streets in Charlottetown; however, a journal entry contradicts this and indicates that it was actually held in the home of James Richardson.

In 1839, an important distinction was drawn between the executive and legislative capacities of the Legislative Council. This distinction proved to be an important step on the road to responsible government which was finally implemented in 1851.

Prior to 1893, Prince Edward Island had a bicameral system of government, consisting of a Legislative Council and a House of Assembly. These two bodies were amalgamated in 1893 to create one Legislative Assembly consisting of 30 members elected from 15 different constituencies. Each constituency returned a Councillor and an Assemblyman to the Assembly. The only change to this system of returning members to the assembly was the addition of two Members resulting from the creation of 6th Queens in 1966. In 1996, the system and the electoral map were restructured, and the province now has twenty-seven Members of the Legislative Assembly, each elected from a different constituency.

In 2015, Province House was closed for repairs and conservation work. The legislature moved to the adjacent Hon. George Coles Building, where it is expected to remain for several years.

Composition
The Legislative Assembly currently has 27 single-member districts and is currently the smallest provincial assembly in Canada.

Prior to the 1996 provincial election, the province was divided into 16 dual-member districts, each of which was represented by one member who held the title Assemblyman and one member who held the title Councillor. This was a holdover from the legislature's historic bicameral structure; instead of simply abolishing its upper house as most Canadian provinces with historically bicameral legislatures did, Prince Edward Island merged the two houses in 1893. Although both members sat in the same legislative house, all voters in a district voted for the assemblyman while only landowners could vote for the councillor. Excepting the division of 5th Queens, the district that contained the capital city of Charlottetown, into two districts in 1966, these district boundaries were never adjusted for demographic or population changes.

The property qualification was discontinued in 1963, largely eliminating any practical distinction between the two roles, although the nominal titles continued to be used until the current single-member districts were introduced in 1996.

Members of the Legislative Assembly
Cabinet ministers are in bold, party leaders are in italic, and the Speaker of the Legislative Assembly is designated by a dagger (†).

[*] Gallant is serving as the legislative leader for the Liberals, as Liberal party leader Sharon Cameron is not a member of the legislature.

Seating plan

Party standings

Officers

The legislature Black Rod has been carried by the Sergeant-at-Arms since 2000.

See also
 List of Prince Edward Island General Assemblies

References

External links
 The Legislative Assembly of Prince Edward Island, official website
 Canadian Governments Compared

Prince Edward Island
Prince Edward Island
1773 establishments in Prince Edward Island
Prince Edward Island politics-related lists